Ema Kozin is a Slovenian professional boxer. She is a world champion in two weight classes, having held the WIBA middleweight title since 2017; the WIBA super-middleweight title since 2018; the WIBF super-middleweight title since 2019; and the WBC interim female middleweight title since October 2020. As of September 2020, she is ranked as the world's fourth best active female super-middleweight by The Ring and the sixth best active middleweight by BoxRec.

Professional career
Kozin made her professional debut on 24 September 2016, scoring a four-round unanimous decision (UD) victory over Ina Milohanic at the Tabor Arena in Maribor, Slovenia.

After compiling a record of 9–0 (6 KOs) she fought for her first professional title, the WBU (German) female middleweight title, facing Elene Sikmashvili on 16 September 2017 at the Sound Factory in Gersthofen, Germany. Kozin defeated Sikmashvili by UD to capture the WBU (German) title, with one judge scoring the bout 99–91 and the other two scoring it 96–93.

She collected two more titles in her next outing, defeating Florence Muthoni by UD on 14 October at the Trivoli Arena in Ljubljana, Slovenia, capturing the vacant WBC International and WBF female middleweight titles with the judges' scorecards reading 99–91, 97–93, and 96–94.

In her next fight she captured her first major world title in the women's ranks – the WIBA middleweight title – by defeating Dora Tollar via third-round technical knockout (TKO) on 15 December in Banja Luka, Bosnia and Herzegovina. At the time of the stoppage she was ahead on all three judges' scorecards at 20–18.

She successfully defended her WBF female and WIBA titles by defeating former welterweight world champion Eva Bajic via fifth-round knockout (KO) on 16 March 2018 at Remington Park in Oklahoma City, capturing the vacant GBC title in the process. She defeated Bajic in a rematch in July, winning by split decision (SD) to retain her WBF female and WIBA titles. Two judges scored the bout 97–93 and 97–94 in favour of Kozin while the third scored it 100–90 for Bajic. For both fights Kozin was originally scheduled to face Mapule Ngubane, but after the latter failed to secure a visa Bajic was brought in as a late replacement.

She moved up to super-middleweight for her next bout, fighting to a split draw against Irais Hernandez with the vacant WBC Silver and WBF female titles up for grabs on 8 September 2018 at Arena Zagreb in Croatia. One judge scored the bout 96–95 in favour of Kozin, another scored it 97–93 to Hernandez while the third judge scored it even at 95–95. The pair had an immediate rematch the following month, this time for the vacant WIBA super-middleweight title on 14 October at Technikum in Munich, Germany. Kozin settled the score with a UD victory to become a two-weight world champion. Two judges scored the bout 99–91 and the third scored it 98–92.

Five months later she made a defence of her WIBA title against Sanna Turunen, with the vacant WBF female super-middleweight title also on the line. The bout took place on 23 March 2019 at the MHPArena in Ludwigsburg, Germany. Kozin defeated Turunen via UD to become the WBF female and WIBA champion in two weight classes, simultaneously, with the judges' scorecards reading 99–91, 98–92, and 97–93.

After scoring a TKO victory against Edita Karabeg in a non-title fight in June, Kozin made a defence of her WBF female and WIBA titles against Maria Lindberg with the vacant IBA female, GBU female, and WIBF super-middleweight titles also on the line. The bout took place on 6 October 2019 at Arena Stožice in Ljubljana. Kozin added the vacant titles to her collection with a UD victory, with all three judges scoring the bout 96–94.

Professional boxing record

References

External links

Living people
Year of birth missing (living people)
Sportspeople from Ljubljana
Slovenian boxers
Middleweight boxers
Super-middleweight boxers
Women's International Boxing Association champions